Bridgewater was a 52-gun third rate  frigate built for the navy of the Commonwealth of England at Deptford, and launched in 1654.

After the Restoration in 1660, her name was changed to HMS Anne. It was named after Anne Hyde. The ship was accidentally blown up in 1673. Its reconstruction was carried out during the second Dutch war by Christopher Pett in Woolwich.

Notes

References

Lavery, Brian (2003) The Ship of the Line - Volume 1: The development of the battlefleet 1650-1850. Conway Maritime Press. .

Ships of the line of the Royal Navy
Ships built in Deptford
1650s ships
Speaker-class ships of the line
Anne Hyde
Maritime incidents in 1673